The Uninvited Guest is a 1923 British silent drama film directed by George Dewhurst and starring Stewart Rome, Madge Stuart and Arthur Walcott.

Cast
 Stewart Rome – Philip Orme
 Madge Stuart – Mavis Steele
 Arthur Walcott – Spaling
 Linda Moore – Hilda
 Cecil Morton York – Felix Steele
 Leal Douglas – Baines
 Cameron Carr

References

External links

1923 films
British silent feature films
British drama films
1923 drama films
Films directed by George Dewhurst
British black-and-white films
1920s English-language films
1920s British films
Silent drama films